Michelle Jacqueline Chamuel (born 1986) is an American singer, songwriter and music producer. She has released several works as a solo artist and in partnership with others. She was the lead singer of the band Ella Riot and the runner-up on season four of The Voice. Influenced by Imogen Heap and Max Martin, she is also known by her producer moniker The Reverb Junkie. Her most recent album titled Couldn't Stay was released in 2020.

Early life
Chamuel was born in Wellesley, Massachusetts, to Joalie Davie and Jacques Chamuel. Her parents are Jewish of Egyptian descent. Her father was an acoustical engineer and played the violin. She started on piano and violin at an early age. In seventh grade she started to sequence music on a synthesizer, sing and compose. She graduated from Wellesley High School and studied performing arts technology at the University of Michigan.

Career

Ella Riot and early works
In 2007 Chamuel joined the Ann Arbor, Michigan-based band My Dear Disco, later named Ella Riot. Initially the band was instrumental, and her addition as lead vocalist was a turning point in the band's direction. The band's name was in part a tribute to Ella Fitzgerald. The band toured extensively and released two definitive works, Dancethink and Love Child. The band went into hiatus in October 2011.

In a 2010 interview with AfterEllen, Chamuel spoke about being out and lesbian in the music industry, staying true to herself, and artists that inspired her such as Elton John and Ani DiFranco.

After Ella Riot, she moved to Amherst, Massachusetts, and worked independently. She released an album titled s/he, an EP titled All the Pretty People and an EP titled EP 1 in partnership with other artists. She released remix music with original lyrics and vocal compositions and collaborated with several musicians as a featured artist. She names Max Martin and Imogen Heap as major influences. She was influenced by the vocal styles of Heap and Ella Fitzgerald and said they "opened me up to the idea that one could sing melodies like an instrument."

The Voice and All I Want

Chamuel took part in the fourth season of NBC's The Voice. In the blind audition she sang Katy Perry's "I Kissed a Girl" and chose Usher as her coach. In her first live performance she sang Cyndi Lauper's "True Colors". Over the next four live performances she was voted into the Top 5. Her rendition of "Just Give Me a Reason" was called a killer performance by Pink's official website. Her rendition of Taylor Swift's "I Knew You Were Trouble" received an enthusiastic approval from Swift and charted on the Billboard Hot 100. In the final round she sang Annie Lennox's "Why" and U2's "One" in a duet with Usher. She came in second place.

She released her first solo album All I Want in September 2013. She called the album her "solo electronic project" and said her studio work as The Reverb Junkie focuses on creative sound works, whereas the work released under her own name has more of a pop focus. The album debuted at number 6 on the U.S. Dance/Electronic Albums chart. In late 2013 she spoke at a fundraiser for "Voices from Inside", an organization dedicated to empowering women. She released a single titled "Go Down Singing" and spoke at a TEDx gathering about the role of music in shaping one's sense of home.

Solo albums and later works

In January 2014 Chamuel and producer Arjun Singh released an EP titled The Drift. The EP features hip hop artist Isaac Castor. She released a song on Valentine's Day titled "Made for Me" and an EP titled EP 2 in April 2014. This was her second EP in partnership with producer David Gonzalez. In 2014 she performed several shows in the U.S. and Ireland, including a seventeen city U.S. tour.

She released the album Face the Fire in February 2015. She said as a teenager she was obsessed with pop hits on Top 40 radio and in this album she wanted to produce well-crafted pop music. She performed an acoustic version of "Golden", the album's third track, on VH1's Morning Buzz show. The album debuted at number 21 on the U.S. Independent Albums chart.

Chamuel released an EP titled I Am in November 2015 under The Reverb Junkie moniker. She co-wrote and produced "Hang out with You", a song by singer-songwriter Mary Lambert. She released an EP titled Feel It in August 2016. This was the first of several works each in a different style. In interviews leading to the EP's release, she spoke about her focus on all aspects of music production. In May 2017 she released a self-produced album titled Insights & Turnpikes, a singer-songwriter style album which includes several stripped-down acoustic songs.

In 2017 to 2020, she released two instrumental works under The Reverb Junkie moniker titled Music for: Summer Chores and The Last Person Awake, as well as a single titled "A Complicated Time of Year". She released a studio album titled Couldn't Stay under The Reverb Junkie moniker in September 2020.

Discography

Studio albums
s/he (2011)
All I Want (2013)
Face the Fire (2015)
Insights & Turnpikes (2017)
Couldn't Stay (2020)

Extended plays
All the Pretty People (2012)
EP 1 (2012)
The Drift (2014)
EP 2 (2014)
I Am (2015)
Feel It (2016)
A Colorful Christmastime (2020)

Instrumental works
Music for: Summer Chores (Vol 1) (2017)
The Last Person Awake (Music for: Vol 2) (2020)

Singles
"My Dear Disco" (2006)
"U and I" (2012)
"Go Down Singing" (2013)
"A Complicated Time of Year" (2019)

Films

Notes

References

External links

1986 births
Living people
21st-century American women singers
21st-century women composers
21st-century American composers
American women singer-songwriters
American women pop singers
American synth-pop musicians
American electronic musicians
American women in electronic music
American women record producers
Jewish American musicians
Jewish women singers
American lesbian musicians
American LGBT singers
LGBT people from Massachusetts
The Voice (franchise) contestants
Participants in American reality television series
University of Michigan School of Music, Theatre & Dance alumni
Musicians from Ann Arbor, Michigan
Singer-songwriters from Massachusetts
Singer-songwriters from Michigan
Wellesley High School alumni
American people of Egyptian-Jewish descent
21st-century American singers
20th-century American LGBT people
21st-century American LGBT people
21st-century American Jews